Aircraft can have different ways to take off and land. Conventional airplanes accelerate along the ground until sufficient lift is generated for takeoff, and reverse the process to land. Some airplanes can take off at low speed, this being a short takeoff. Some aircraft such as helicopters and Harrier jump jets can take off and land vertically. Rockets also usually take off vertically, but some designs can land horizontally.

Horizontal takeoff and landing

Aircraft

Conventional takeoff and landing (CTOL)

Takeoff

Takeoff is the phase of flight in which an aircraft goes through a transition from moving along the ground (taxiing) to flying in the air, usually starting on a runway. For balloons, helicopters and some specialized fixed-wing aircraft (VTOL aircraft such as the Harrier), no runway is needed. Takeoff is the opposite of landing.

Landing

Landing is the last part of a flight, where a flying aircraft or spacecraft (or animals) returns to the ground. When the flying object returns to water, the process is called alighting, although it is commonly called "landing" and "touchdown" as well. A normal aircraft flight would include several parts of flight including taxi, takeoff, climb, cruise, descent and landing.

Short takeoff and landing (STOL)

STOL is an acronym for short take-off and landing, aircraft with very short runway requirements.

Catapult launch and arrested recovery (CATOBAR)

CATOBAR (catapult assisted takeoff but arrested recovery) is a system used for the launch and recovery of aircraft from the deck of an aircraft carrier. Under this technique, aircraft are launched using a catapult and land on the ship (the recovery phase) using arrestor wires.

Although this system is more costly than alternative methods, it provides greater flexibility in carrier operations, since it allows the vessel to support conventional aircraft. Alternate methods of launch and recovery can only use aircraft with STOVL or STOBAR capability.

Short Take Off But Arrested Recovery (STOBAR)

STOBAR (Short Take Off But Arrested Recovery) is a system used for the launch and recovery of aircraft from the deck of an aircraft carrier, combining elements of both STOVL (Short Take-Off and Vertical Landing) and CATOBAR (Catapult Assisted Take-Off But Arrested Recovery).

Spacecraft (HTHL)
Horizontal takeoff, horizontal landing (HTHL) — is the mode of operation for the first private commercial spaceplane, the two-stage-to-space Scaled Composites Tier One from the Ansari X-Prize SpaceShipOne/WhiteKnightOne combination. It is also used for the upcoming Tier 1b SpaceShipTwo/WhiteKnightTwo combination. A prominent example of its use was the North American X-15 program. In these examples the space craft are carried to altitude on a "mother ship" before launch.
The failed proposals for NASA Space Shuttle replacements, Rockwell X-30 NASP used this mode of operation but were conceived as single stage to orbit.

The Lynx rocketplane was a suborbital HTHL spaceplane developed by XCOR Aerospace that was slated to begin atmospheric flight testing in late 2011. However, after numerous delays, XCOR Aerospace went bankrupt in 2017 without finishing a prototype.

Reaction Engines Skylon, a design descendant of the 1980s British HOTOL ("Horizontal Take-Off and Landing") design project, is an HTHL spaceplane currently in the early stages of development in the United Kingdom.

Both the Lynx rocketplane and SpaceShipTwo have been proffered to NASA to carry suborbital research payloads in response to NASA's suborbital reusable launch vehicle (sRLV) solicitation under the NASA Flight Operations Program.

An early example was the 1960s Northrop HL-10 atmospheric test aircraft where the HL stands for "Horizontal Lander".

Vertical takeoff and landing
Different terms are used for takeoff and landing depending on the source of thrust used. VTVL uses rockets, whereas VTOL uses air, propelled via some kind of rotor system.

Aircraft (VTOL)

Vertical Take-Off and Landing (VTOL) aircraft includes fixed-wing aircraft that can hover, take off and land vertically as well as helicopters and other aircraft with powered rotors, such as tiltrotors. The terminology for spacecraft and rockets is VTVL (vertical takeoff with vertical landing). Some VTOL aircraft can operate in other modes as well, such as CTOL (conventional take-off and landing), STOL (short take-off and landing), and/or STOVL (short take-off and vertical landing). Others, such as some helicopters, can only operate by VTOL, due to the aircraft lacking landing gear that can handle horizontal motion. VTOL is a subset of V/STOL (vertical and/or short take-off and landing).

Besides the ubiquitous helicopter, there are currently two types of VTOL aircraft in military service: craft using a tiltrotor, such as the Bell Boeing V-22 Osprey, and aircraft using directed jet thrust such as the Harrier family. In the civilian sector currently only helicopters are in general use (some other types of commercial VTOL aircraft have been proposed and are under development as of 2017).

Rocket (VTVL)

Vertical takeoff, vertical landing (VTVL) is a form of takeoff and landing for rockets. Multiple VTVL craft have flown. The most widely known and commercially successful VTVL rocket is SpaceX's Falcon 9 first stage.

VTVL technologies were developed substantially with small rockets after 2000, in part due to incentive prize competitions like the Lunar Lander Challenge.  Successful small VTVL rockets were developed by Masten Space Systems, Armadillo Aerospace, and others.

Vertical takeoff and horizontal landing

Aircraft (VTOHL)
In aviation the term VTOHL ("Vertical Take-Off and Horizontal Landing") as well as several VTOHL aviation-specific subtypes: VTOCL, VTOSL, VTOBAR exist.

Zero length launch system

The zero length launch system or zero length take-off system (ZLL, ZLTO, ZEL, ZELL) was a system whereby jet fighters and attack aircraft were intended to be placed upon rockets attached to mobile launch platforms. Most zero length launch experiments took place in the 1950s, during the Cold War.

Spacecraft (VTHL)

Vertical takeoff, horizontal landing (VTHL) is the mode of operation for all current and formerly operational orbital spaceplanes, such as the Boeing X-37, the NASA Space Shuttle, the 1988 Soviet Buran space shuttle, as well as the circa-1960 USAF Boeing X-20 Dyna-Soar project. For launch vehicles an advantage of VTHL over HTHL is that the wing can be smaller, since it only has to carry the landing weight of the vehicle, rather than the takeoff weight.

There have been several other VTHL proposals that never flew including NASA Space Shuttle proposed replacements Lockheed Martin X-33 and VentureStar. The 1990s NASA concept spaceplane, the HL-20 Personnel Launch System (HL stands for "Horizontal Lander"), was VTHL, as was a circa-2003 derivative of the HL-20, the Orbital Space Plane concept.

, two VTHL commercial spaceplanes were in various stages of proposal/development, both successors to the HL-20 design. The Sierra Nevada Corporation Dream Chaser follows the outer mold line of the earlier HL-20.
The circa-2011 proposed Orbital Sciences Corporation Prometheus was a blended lifting body spaceplane that followed the outer mold line of the circa-2003 Orbital Space Plane, itself a derivative of the HL-20; however, Prometheus did not receive any NASA contracts and Orbital has announced they will not pursue further development.

German Aerospace Center studied reusable VTHL Liquid Fly-back Boosters from 1999. Design was intended to replace Ariane 5 solid rocket boosters. The U.S. government-funded, Reusable Booster System program, initiated by the USAF in 2010,
had specified a high-level requirement that the design be VTHL,
but the funding was discontinued after 2012.

In 2017 DARPA selected a VTHL design for XS-1.

Horizontal takeoff and vertical landing
Horizontal takeoff and vertical landing (HTVL) is the spaceflight equivalent of aviation HTOVL (and its subtypes CTOVL, STOVL, CATOVL). This mode of operation has not been used, but has been proposed for some systems that use a two-stage to orbit launch system with a plane based first stage, and a capsule return vehicle. One of the few HTVL concept vehicles is the 1960s concept spacecraft Hyperion SSTO, designed by Philip Bono.

Multi-mode configurations
Vehicles use more than one mode also exist.

Vertical/Short takeoff landing (V/STOL)

Vertical and/or short take-off and landing (V/STOL) aircraft that are able to take off or land vertically or on short runways. Vertical takeoff and landing (VTOL) includes craft that do not require runways at all. Generally, a V/STOL aircraft needs to be able to hover; helicopters are not typically considered under the V/STOL classification.

A rolling takeoff, sometimes with a ramp (ski-jump), reduces the amount of thrust required to lift an aircraft from the ground (compared with vertical takeoff), and hence increases the payload and range that can be achieved for a given thrust. For instance, the Harrier is incapable of taking off vertically with a full weapons and fuel load. Hence V/STOL aircraft generally use a runway if it is available. I.e. Short Take-Off and Vertical Landing (STOVL) or Conventional Take-off and Landing (CTOL) operation is preferred to VTOL operation.

V/STOL was developed to allow fast jets to be operated from clearings in forests, from very short runways, and from small aircraft carriers that would previously only have been able to carry helicopters.

The main advantage of V/STOL aircraft is closer basing to the enemy, which reduces response time and tanker support requirements. In the case of the Falklands War, it also permitted high performance fighter air cover and ground attack without a large aircraft carrier equipped with a catapult.

The latest V/STOL aircraft is the F-35B, which entered service in 2015.

References

External links

 
Flight phases
Articles containing video clips